Nuno de Campos (born 1969)  is a Portuguese painter, living in New York City, United States.

Life and work
Nuno de Campos was born in Porto, Portugal,

His paintings are done in tempera, and are known for their luminous quality.  He lives and works in New York City.

Selected exhibitions
2001 Clifford-Smith Gallery, Boston, Ma.
2004 Private Lives - Westby Gallery, Rowan University, NJ (Lisa Hatchadoorian, curator)
2005 Desenhar discurso: digressões sobre uma urbanidade disruptiva - Bienal de Cerveira, Portugal (Miguel von Hafe Pérez, curator)
2005 Extended Painting - Prague Biennale 2, Praga, República Checa (Helena Kontova, Giancarlo Politi curators)
2005 Segunda Língua - Reitoria da Universidade de Coimbra, Portugal (Miguel Amado, curator)
2005 Bichos Nossos, Nossos Bichos - Arte Contempo, Lisbon Portugal (Miguel Amado, curator)
2006 The Outwin Boochever Portrait Competition Exhibition - National Portrait Gallery, Smithsonian Institution, Washington DC

Notes

References
 Lloyd, Ann Wilson (December 2001) "Nuno de Campos at Clifford-Smith" Art in America 89(12):  p. 123
 Miller, Francine Koslow (February 2000) "Nuno De Campos" Artforum International   38(6):  p. 123
 Miller, Francine Koslow (June/July 2001) "The seductive, soothing, and controlling lap" Art New England 22(4):  pp. 18–20

External links
 Nuno de Campos website

1969 births
Living people
Portuguese painters
Portuguese male painters
Contemporary painters
Artists from Porto